The British Council is a British organisation specialising in international cultural and educational opportunities. It works in over 100 countries: promoting a wider knowledge of the United Kingdom and the English language (and the Welsh language in Argentina); encouraging cultural, scientific, technological and educational co-operation with the United Kingdom. The organisation has been called a soft power extension of UK foreign policy, as well as a tool for propaganda.

The British Council is governed by a Royal Charter. It is also a public corporation and an executive nondepartmental public body (NDPB), sponsored by the Foreign, Commonwealth and Development Office. Its headquarters are in Stratford, London. Its Chairman is Stevie Spring and its Chief Executive is Scott McDonald.

History
1934: British Foreign Office officials created the "British Committee for Relations with Other Countries" to support English education abroad, promote British culture and fight the rise of fascism. The name quickly became British Council for Relations with Other Countries.
1936: The organisation's name was officially shortened to the British Council.
1938: The British Council opens its first four offices in Bucharest (Romania), Cairo (Egypt), Lisbon (Portugal) and Warsaw (Poland). The offices in Portugal are currently the oldest in continuous operation in the world.
1940: King George VI granted the British Council a Royal Charter for promoting "a wider knowledge of [the United Kingdom] and the English language abroad and developing closer cultural relations between [the UK] and other countries".
1942: The British Council undertook a promotion of British culture overseas. The music section of the project was a recording of significant recent compositions by British composers: E.J. Moeran's Symphony in G minor was the first work to be recorded under this initiative, followed by recordings of Walton's Belshazzar's Feast, Bliss's Piano Concerto, Bax's Third Symphony, and Elgar's The Dream of Gerontius.

1944: In August, after the liberation of Paris, Austin Gill was sent by the council to reestablish the Paris office, which soon had tours by the Old Vic company, Julian Huxley and T. S. Eliot.
1946: The British Council collected handicraft products from crafts that were being practised in the British countryside for an "Exhibition of Rural Handicrafts from Great Britain" that travelled to Australia and New Zealand. The majority of the collection was sold to the Museum of English Rural Life in 1960 and 1961.
2007: The Russian Foreign Ministry ordered the British Council to close its offices outside Moscow. The Ministry alleged that it had violated Russian tax regulations, a move that British officials claimed was a retaliation over the British expulsion of Russian diplomats allegedly involved with the poisoning of Alexander Litvinenko. This caused the British Council to cease carrying out all English-language examinations in Russia from January 2008. In early 2009, a Russian arbitration court ruled that the majority of the tax claims, valued at $6.6 million, were unjustified.
2011: On 19 August, a group of armed men attacked the British Council office in Kabul, the capital of Afghanistan, killing at least 12 people – none of them British – and temporarily took over the compound. All the attackers were killed in counter-attacks by forces guarding the compound. The British Council office was relocated to the British Embassy compound, as the British Council compound was destroyed in the suicide attack.
2013: The British Council in Tripoli, Libya, was targeted by a car bomb on the morning of 23 April. Diplomatic sources were reported as saying that "the bombers were foiled as they were preparing to park a rigged vehicle in front of the compound gate". The attempted attack was simultaneous with the attack on the French Embassy in Tripoli on the same day that injured two French security guards, one severely, and wounded several residents in neighbouring houses. A jihadist group calling itself the Mujahedeen Brigade was suspected possibly linked to Al-Qaeda in the Islamic Maghreb.

Organisation 
The British Council is a charity governed by Royal Charter. It is also a public corporation and an executive nondepartmental public body (NDPB), sponsored by the Foreign, Commonwealth and Development Office. Its headquarters are in Stratford, London. Its chair is Stevie Spring, and its CEO Scott McDonald.

The British Council's total income in 2014–15 was £973 million principally made up of £154.9 million grant-in-aid received from the Foreign, Commonwealth and Development Office; £637 million income from fees and teaching and examinations services; and £164 million from contracts.

The British Council works in more than 100 countries: promoting a wider knowledge of the UK and the English language; encouraging cultural, scientific, technological and educational understanding and co-operation; changing people's lives through access to UK education, skills, qualifications, culture and society; and attracting people who matter to the future of the UK and engaging them with the UK's culture, educational opportunities and its diverse, modern, open society.

In 2014–15 the British Council spent: £489 million developing a wider knowledge of the English language; £238 million encouraging educational co-operation and promoting the advancement of education; £155 million building capacity for social change; £80 million encouraging cultural, scientific and technological co-operation; and £10 million on governance, tax and trading expenses.

Notable activity

English and examinations 
The British Council offers face-to-face teaching in more than 80 teaching centres in more than 50 countries 

Three million candidates took UK examinations with the British Council in more than 850 towns and cities in 2014–15.

The British Council jointly runs the global IELTS English-language standardised test with University of Cambridge ESOL Examinations and IDP Education Australia. Over 2.5 million IELTS tests were delivered in 2014–15.

Massive Open Online Course (MOOC)
In 2014, the British Council launched its first MOOC, Exploring English: Language and Culture, on the UK social learning platform FutureLearn. This was accessed by over 230,000 people.

English for peace
"Peacekeeping English" is a collaboration between the British Council, the Foreign, Commonwealth and Development Office and the Ministry of Defence to improve the English-language skills of military personnel through the Peacekeeping English Project (PEP). PEP is helping train approximately 50,000 military and police service personnel in 28 countries, amongst them Libya, Ethiopia and Georgia.

Mobility programmes

Education UK
In 2013, the British Council relaunched the global website Education UK for international students interested in a UK education. The site receives 2.2 million visitors per year and includes a search tool for UK courses and scholarships, advice and articles about living and studying in the UK.

Erasmus+
From 2014 to 2020, the British Council and Ecorys UK jointly administered almost €1 billion of the €14.7 billion Erasmus+ programme offering education, training, youth and sport opportunity for young people in the UK. It was expected that nearly 250,000 will have undertaken activities abroad with the programme.

Schools

Connecting Classrooms
Over 16,000 schools have taken part in an international school partnership or benefited from teacher training through the British Council Connecting Classrooms programmes.

Arts and culture

ACCELERATE
ACCELERATE was a leadership programme for Aboriginal and Torres Strait Islander people in the creative arts, run jointly by the British Council and the Australia Council in partnership with Australian state arts agencies, between 2009 and 2016. During that time, 35 people participated in the program, with many alumni going on to excel in their fields.

UK-India Year of Culture 

Her Majesty Queen Elizabeth II hosted the official launch of the UK-India Year of Culture on 27 February 2017 at Buckingham Palace, with Indian Finance Minister Arun Jaitley representing Prime Minister Narendra Modi. The British Council worked with the Palace and British-Indian start-up Studio Carrom to project a peacock, India's national bird, onto the facade of Buckingham Palace.

fiveFilms4freedom
In 2015, the British Council launched fiveFilms4freedom a free, online, 10-day LGBT film festival with the British Film Institute supported by the UN Free & Equal campaign. It was the first global online LGBT film festival. The festival runs a 24-hour campaign to ask people to watch a movie and show that love is a human right. In 2016, films were viewed by over 1.5m people in 179 countries.

Shakespeare Lives
In October 2015 the British Council announced a global programme with the BBC, British Film Institute, the National Theatre, the Royal Shakespeare Company, the Shakespeare 400 consortium, the Shakespeare Birthplace Trust and Shakespeare's Globe to celebrate Shakespeare's life and work on the 400th anniversary of this death.

Selector Radio
Selector Radio is a weekly two-hour radio show, produced by Folded Wing for the British Council. Originally launched in 2001, the show is now broadcast in more than 30 countries around the world, connecting a global audience to a wide range of music the United Kingdom has to offer, covering a variety of genres from grime, indie, soul, dance and more. The show features interviews, guest DJ mixes and exclusive live sessions from some of the UK's most exciting artists. It avoids many mainstream acts, in favour of emerging talent and underground styles. It has an estimated listenership of over four million people. The show is hosted in the UK by Jamz Supernova – many countries take the English language version of the show and create a new show from the tracks and features, translating the 'links' into local language.

Cultural and educational exchange with North Korea 
The British Council has been running a teacher training programme in North Korea since 2001. In July 2014 the British Council signed a Memorandum of Understanding with the Democratic People's Republic of Korea (DPRK) for cultural and educational exchange.

Other activities

Love's Labours Lost 
The British Council-supported production of Love's Labours Lost in 2005 was the first performance of a Shakespeare play in Afghanistan in more than 17 years. The play was performed in the Afghan language of Dari.

Young Creative Entrepreneur Awards 
The British Council Young Creative Entrepreneurs identify and support talented people from across the creative industries such as the International Young Publisher of the Year, International Young Design Entrepreneur of the Year, International Young Music Entrepreneur of the Year and British Council West Africa Arts Program ~ Creative Entrepreneurs 2018 awards.

Controversies

Expenses 
In 2010, Conservative MP Mark Lancaster, the then Lord Commissioner of HM Treasury, the then Speaker of the House of Commons Michael Martin, and other MPs were involved in rows over expenses incurred on undisclosed taxpayer-funded British Council trips. The British Council's then Chief Executive, Martin Davidson, also faced press criticism for expenses claimed in apparent breach of the British Council's own internal rules for overnight stays in London.

Closure in Russia 
In 2007, the Russian government accused the British Council of illegal operation by breaking Russian tax laws and ordered the organisation to close two of its offices. Many believed that the council had become the victim of a diplomatic row between the UK and Russia. In 2018, Russia expelled 23 British diplomats and closed down the British Council (due to lack of regulations of its activities) along with the general consulate in St. Petersburg. The move was reported to be retaliation against the UK's actions toward Russia for the poisoning of Sergei and Yulia Skripal.

Israel and Palestine 
The British Council has been a primary partner of the Palestine Festival of Literature since the Festival's beginning in 2008. In 2009, the Israeli police, acting on a court order, closed down the venue scheduled to host the Festival's closing event since there was Palestinian Authority involvement, but the British Council stepped in and the evening was relocated to its grounds.

The British Council supports the festival, also known as PalFest. A controversial issue arose in 2012, because PalFest's website states that they endorse the "2004 Palestinian call for the academic and cultural boycott of Israel". Susanna Nicklin, the council's director of literature said in response: "The British Council is a non-political organisation, and we believe that international cultural exchange makes a powerful contribution to a more peaceful, tolerant and prosperous world. Therefore, the British Council does not support cultural or academic boycotts."

Dissident Chinese writers 
In April 2012, the British Council faced a storm of protest over the exclusion of dissident Chinese writers from The London Book Fair in 2012. Critics included English PEN and journalist Nick Cohen writing in The Observer, as well as Alastair Niven, a former Literature Director of The British Council itself.

Cuts
In March 2007, the British Council announced its "intention to increase its investment in the Middle East, North Africa and Central and Southern Asia". In June 2007, MPs were told of further closures in Tel Aviv and East Jerusalem (where there had been a British Council Library since 1946). The British Council libraries in Athens and in Belgrade are also to close. Similarly in India, the British Council Libraries at Bhopal and Trivandrum were closed despite protests from library users as part of the Council's policy to "reduce its physical presence" in the country and to divert funds to mega projects in the fields of culture, education, science and research.

British Council libraries and offices have also been closed in a number of other countries judged by the British Council to be of little strategic or commercial importance, as it refocused its activities on China and the Persian Gulf area. Council offices were closed in Lesotho, Swaziland, Ecuador and provincial Länder in Germany in 2000–2001 – as well as Belarus – prompting Parliamentary criticism. Subsequent promises by British Council Chair Neil Kinnock to a conference in Edinburgh that the Belarus closure would hopefully prove to be just a "temporary" withdrawal proved illusory. The British Council office in Peru also closed in September 2006 as part of a rethink of its strategy in Latin America. In Italy British Council closed its offices in Turin and Bologna, and reduced the size of offices in Milan and Rome (with the closure of the library in the latter).

Charles Arnold-Baker, author of the Companion to British History said of the British Council's shift in priorities: "This whole policy is misconstrued from top to bottom. We are going somewhere where we can't succeed and neglecting our friends in Europe who wish us well. The only people who are going to read our books in Beirut or Baghdad are converts already."

The article also points out that the Alliance française and the Goethe-Institut, unlike the British Council, are both expanding and replenishing libraries Europe-wide. France opened its new library in Tel Aviv in 2007, just a few months after the British Council closed there and shut down the British Council library in West Jerusalem. In Gaza, the Institut français supports the Gaza municipal library in partnership with the local authority and a municipal twinning link between Gaza City and the French port of Dunkerque. In Oslo British Council informs Norwegian callers that "our office is not open to the public and we do not have an enquiry service". Goethe Institute also has a more visible presence in Glasgow than the British Council. There is now, in contrast, only one British Council office left in Germany – and that is in Berlin.

Accountability
Formally it is to its sponsoring department, the Foreign, Commonwealth and Development Office, that the UK Parliamentary Table Office refers any parliamentary questions about the British Council.

The effectiveness of British Council efforts to promote higher education in China was examined in the UK by the House of Commons Select Committee on Education and Skills in a report issued in August 2007. It expressed concern that in terms of joint educational programmes involving Chinese universities, the UK lagged behind Australia, USA, Hong Kong, Canada and France. In its evidence to this committee, the British Council had argued that "UK degrees are highly valued by international students for their global recognition. International students adopt an essentially utilitarian view of higher education which is likely to increasingly involve consideration of value for money, including opting for programmes at least partly delivered offshore". As their preferred marketing 'model', the British Council gave the example of India where their UK India Education and Research Initiative is being 'championed' by British multinational oil companies such as BP and Shell, the pharmaceutical giant GSK and arms company BAE Systems.

Criticism of British Council marketing efforts in this area have also come from Scotland where The Sunday Herald obtained documents under the Freedom of Information Act showing that the British Council's Marketing Co-ordinator in the USA had been referring to the University of Stirling as 'The University of Sterling' (sic) and also documenting 'tensions' between Scottish Executive civil servants and British Council in India and China over overseas promotion of universities in Scotland where education is a devolved responsibility. The Sunday Herald reported that these turf wars were undermining the Scottish Executive's key Fresh Talent policy.

Some of the activities of the British Council were examined in 2007/08 by the National Audit Office (NAO). The NAO's report, The British Council: Achieving Impact, concluded "that the British Council's performance is strong and valued by its customers and stakeholders". It also concluded, however, that its English classes are elitist and have unfair advantages over commercial providers, as well as questioning thousands of unanswered phone-calls and e-mails to British Council offices.

As part of its examination of the Foreign, Commonwealth and Development Office Annual Report, the Foreign Affairs Committee spends an hour each year examining witnesses from the British Council but even this level of scrutiny is undermined by a Commons ruling exempting MPs from the requirement to declare overseas trips paid for by The British Council.

Two members of the Public Accounts Committee (Nigel Griffiths MP and Ian Davidson MP) were office-bearers in the British Council Associate Parliamentary Group. Nigel Griffiths MP was Vice-Chair of this British Council lobby group until stepping down as an MP.

In 2008 the British Council was called before the Public Accounts Committee (PAC) following earlier publication of a National Audit Office report. The subsequent PAC report confirmed that Nigel Griffiths MP – Vice Chair of The British Council Associate Parliamentary Group – was part of the small number of PAC members who approved this report on the British Council despite not having been recorded as being present during the evidence session – in June 2008 – where the British Council's Chief Executive was cross-examined. Mr Griffiths had earlier travelled to Russia and spoke favourably of British Council activities there in January 1998 around the time that their man in St Petersburg (Stephen Kinnock) was expelled.

In April 2009 the British Council was told to clean up its act by the Information Commissioner after losing staff data that included details of their trade union affiliations and lying about the encryption status of the computer disc lost.

Following the accusations made against the British Council in Russia (see above) Trevor Royle, the experienced Diplomatic Editor of The Sunday Herald quoted a 'British diplomatic source' admitting: "There is a widespread assumption that The British Council is a wing of our Secret Intelligence Services, however minor. Officially it is no such thing but there are connections. Why should it be otherwise because all information is invaluable? After all, the British Council also deals with trade missions and inevitably that involves low-grade intelligence-gathering."

In 2005, along with the Alliance française, the Società Dante Alighieri, the Goethe-Institut, the Instituto Cervantes, and the Instituto Camões, the British Council shared in the Prince of Asturias Award for the outstanding achievements of Western Europe's national cultural agencies in communications and the humanities. At the time of this joint award the full extent of The British Council's closure policies in Europe was not yet public knowledge.

In literature 

Royle also goes on to note that the novel The Russia House by John Le Carré (former consular official David Cornwell) opens with a reference to The British Council. The organisation's "first ever audio fair for the teaching of the English language and the spread of British culture" is "grinding to its excruciating end" and one of its officials is packing away his stuff when he is approached by an attractive Russian woman to undertake clandestine delivery of a manuscript which she claims is a novel to an English publisher who she says is 'her friend'!

It is also featured in one of the scenes in Graham Greene's The Third Man – the character Crabbin, played by Wilfrid Hyde-White in the film, worked for The British Council. In 1946, the writer George Orwell advised serious authors not to work for it as a day-job arguing that "the effort [of writing] is too much to make if one has already squandered one's energies on semi-creative work such as teaching, broadcasting or composing propaganda for bodies such as the British Council". In her autobiography, Dame Stella Rimington, the first woman head of MI5, mentions working for British Council in India prior to joining the British Intelligence Services.

The British Council has been referred to (and its man on-station, Goole) – frequently in a humorous way by Lawrence Durrell in his collection of anecdotes about a diplomat's life on foreign postings for the Foreign, Commonwealth and Development Office – Antrobus Complete.

In the six Olivia Manning novels that make up The Balkan Trilogy and The Levant Trilogy, Guy Pringle is an employee of the British Council, and Council politics make up several of the plot points. The books portray Eastern Europe and the Middle East in the opening years of World War Two.

Burma 

The role of British Council in Burma in 1947 came under scrutiny with release of classified documents to a BBC investigation by journalist Feargal Keane into the role of dissident British colonial officials in the assassination of the then Burmese independence leader Aung San (father of Aung San Suu Kyi). The BBC programme quoted from a 1948 document sent by the Chief of Police in Rangoon to the British Ambassador stating their belief that there had been British involvement in the assassination of Aung San and his Cabinet for which one of his political opponents was hanged and that "the go-between" had been a British Council official named in the programme.

Libya 

In August 2011 a journalist from The Irish Times discovered a certificate dated 2007 issued by the British Council in Tripoli to a daughter of President Gadaffi who had previously been said to have been killed in a US raid on Gadaffi's residence in 1986.

English and examinations 

In July 2011 the Hong Kong edition of China Daily reported on the flourishing "ghost-writing" industry that critics suggest has sprung up around the British Council IELTS tests in China.

A major IELTS corruption scandal in Western Australia resulted in prosecutions in November 2011.

Connecting Classrooms 

In January 2012 the press in Pakistan reported that the Federal Investigations Agency was investigating a visa scam associated with the British Council's "Connecting Classrooms" programme.

Chairs
The Council has been chaired by:
 1934–37 Lord Tyrrell
 1937–41 Lord Lloyd
 1941–45 Sir Malcolm Robertson
 1946–55 Sir Ronald Adam
 1955–59 Sir David Kelly
 1959–67 Lord Bridges
 1968–71 Lord Fulton
 1971–72 Sir Leslie Rowan
 1972–76 Lord Ballantrae
 1977–84 Sir Charles Troughton
 1985–92 Sir David Orr
 1992–98 Sir Martin Jacomb
 1998–2004 Baroness Kennedy of The Shaws
 2004–09 Lord Kinnock
 2010–16 Sir Vernon Ellis
 2016–19 Christopher Rodrigues
 2019–present Stevie Spring

Trade unions
Some staff at the British Council are members of unions. UK staff are represented by the Public and Commercial Services Union. Some employees in Japan belong to the General Union.

Publications

From 1967 to 1989 the British Council published the journal Media in Education and Development.

HistoryInitially titled CETO news, ISSN 0574-9409, it became Educational Television International: a journal of the Centre for Educational Television Overseas, ISSN 0424-6128, in March 1967 (volume 1, issue 1). The journal changed its name again, in March 1971, to Educational Broadcasting International: a journal of the Centre for Educational Development Overseas, ISSN 0013-1970 (volume 5, issue 1). Its final name change was to Media in Education and Development, ISSN 0262-0251, in December 1981 (volume 14 issue 4). The final issue went to print in 1989 (volume 22).

British Council Partnership 
 English UK

List of British Council Approved Centres 
 British Study Centres

Annex

Locations 

The British Council is organised into seven regions.

Americas 
The British Council has offices in:

East Asia-Pacific 
The British Council has offices in:

Europe 
The British Council has offices in:

West Asia and North Africa 
The British Council has offices in: 
 
 
  Bahrain

South Asia 
The British Council has offices in:

Sub-Saharan Africa 
The British Council has offices in:

East Europe 
The British Council has offices in:

See also 

 Eunic
 Teaching English as a Foreign Language (TEFL)
 Cultural diplomacy
 Public diplomacy

References

External links 

British Council Film directory
Royal Charter of the British Council (1993).
Catalogue of the British Council Whitley Council Staff/Trade Union Side archives, held at the Modern Records Centre, University of Warwick
Virtual tour of the British Council provided by Google Arts & Culture

 
1934 establishments in the United Kingdom
Cultural organisations based in the United Kingdom
Cultural promotion organizations
English-language education
English as a global language
Foreign, Commonwealth and Development Office
Foreign Office during World War II
Funding bodies in the United Kingdom
Non-departmental public bodies of the United Kingdom government
British propaganda organisations
Organisations based in the London Borough of Newham
Organizations established in 1934
Stratford, London
Language advocacy organizations